Salt Spring or Salt Springs may refer to:

Brine spring, a saltwater spring

Places

Canada
Salt Spring Island, British Columbia; an island
Saltspring Island Electoral Area, British Columbia
Salt Springs, Nova Scotia (disambiguation)

United States
Salt Spring (Kern County), California; a watering place on the route of El Camino Viejo 
Salt Spring (San Bernardino County), California; a watering place on the Old Spanish Trail (trade route)
Salt Spring Hills, San Bernardino County, California; a range of low mountains
Salt Spring Valley Reservoir, Calaveras County, California; an artificial lake
Salt Springs Reservoir, Alamador County and Calaveras County, California; an artificial lake
Salt Springs, Florida; an unincorporated community
Salt Springs Township, Greenwood County, Kansas
Salt Springs, Missouri; an unincorporated community in Saline County
Salt Springs Township, Randolph County, Missouri
Salt Springs State Park, Pennsylvania
Salt Springs, Syracuse, New York State; a neighborhood

Other uses
 Salt Spring Air (ICAO airline code: 101), a floatplane airline

See also

 Salt spring checkerbloom (Sidalcea neomexicana), a flowering mallow plant
 Little Salt Spring, North Point, Florida, USA
 Great Salt Spring, Illinois, USA
 Salt Spring dollar, a local currency for Saltspring Island, BC, Canada
 Spring (disambiguation)
 Salt (disambiguation)